Mosab Balhous (born 5 October 1983) is a Syrian footballer who is currently playing for Al-Karamah in Syria. Balhous is Syria's most-capped player ever with 86 caps.

Club career

Balhous's career began in the youth system of Al-Karamah before starting his professional career with the senior team. He won with Al-Karamah four Syrian Premier League titles, four Syrian Cups, one Super Cup and helped the club reach the final of the AFC Champions League for the first time. Al-Karamah were defeated 3–2 on aggregate in the final by Jeonbuk Hyundai Motors of the K-League. Three years later, he was an important factor in his side's first-ever accession to AFC Cup Final. Al-Karamah were defeated 2–1 in the final of the second most important association cup in Asia by Kuwait SC of the Kuwaiti Premier League. On 3 October 2011, Balhous joined Al-Wahda on loan until the end of the 2011–12 season. On 26 August 2013, he signed a one-year contract with Oman Professional League club Dhofar. On 7 July 2014, he signed a one-year contract extension with Dhofar.

Later on, he held the position of Goalkeeping Coach for Dhofar, and Syria national team during the 2019 AFC Asian Cup. In February 2019, Balhous came out of retirement to sign for Al-Karamah until the end of the season.

International career
Balhous has been a regular for the Syria national football team since 2006. He made 10 appearances for Syria during the qualifying rounds of the 2010 FIFA World Cup. He was selected as Syria's number one goalkeeper for the AFC Asian Cup 2011 in Qatar. He played full 90 minutes in all Syria's three group games against Saudi Arabia, Japan and Jordan.

Personal life
Mosab is the brother of Al-Karamah's Anas Balhous.

Honours

Club
With Al-Karamah
Syrian Premier League (4): 2005–06, 2006–07, 2007–08, 2008–09
Syrian Cup (4): 2007, 2008, 2009, 2010
Syrian Super Cup (1): 2008
AFC Champions League (0): Runner-up 2006
AFC Cup (0): Runner-up 2009

With Dhofar
Oman Professional League Cup (0): Runner-up 2014–15
Baniyas SC International Tournament (1): Winner 2014

Syria
West Asian Football Federation Championship: 2012

References

External links
 
 
 Mosab Balhous at Goal.com
 
 

1983 births
Living people
Sportspeople from Homs
Syrian footballers
Syria international footballers
Syrian expatriate footballers
Association football goalkeepers
2011 AFC Asian Cup players
Al-Karamah players
Al-Wahda SC (Syria) players
Al-Shorta Damascus players
Dhofar Club players
Oman Professional League players
Expatriate footballers in Oman
Syrian expatriate sportspeople in Oman
Footballers at the 2006 Asian Games
Asian Games competitors for Syria
Syrian Premier League players